The Camera Serial Interface (CSI) is a specification of the Mobile Industry Processor Interface (MIPI) Alliance. It defines an interface between a camera and a host processor. The latest active interface specifications are CSI-2 v3.0, CSI-3 v1.1 and CCS v1.0 which were released in 2019, 2014 and 2017 respectively.

Standards

CSI-1 
CSI-1 was the original standard MIPI interface for cameras. It emerged as an architecture to define the interface between a camera and a host processor. Its successors were MIPI CSI-2 and MIPI CSI-3, two standards that are still evolving.

CSI-2 
The MIPI CSI-2 v1.0 specification was released in 2005. It uses either D-PHY or C-PHY (Both standards are set by the MIPI Alliance) as a physical layer option. The protocol is divided into the following layers:
 Physical Layer (C-PHY/D-PHY)
 Lane Merger Layer.
 Low Level Protocol Layer.
 Pixel to Byte Conversion Layer
 Application Layer

In April 2017, the CSI-2 v2.0 specification was released. CSI-2 v2.0 brought support for RAW-16 and RAW-20 color depth, increase virtual channels from 4 to 32, Latency Reduction and Transport Efficiency (LRTE), Differential Pulse-Code Modulation (DPCM) compression and scrambling to reduce Power Spectral Density.

In September 2019, the CSI-2 v3.0 specification was released. CSI-2 v3.0 introduced Unified Serial Link (USL), Smart Region of Interest (SROI), End-of-Transmission Short Packet (EoTp) and support for RAW-24 color depth.

CSI-3 
MIPI CSI-3 is a high-speed, bidirectional protocol primarily intended for image and video transmission between cameras and hosts within a multi-layered, peer-to-peer, UniPro-based M-PHY device network. It was originally released in 2012 and got re-released in version 1.1 in 2014.

Camera Command Set (CCS) 
The Camera Command Set (CCS) v1.0 specification was released on November 30, 2017. CCS defines a standard set of functionalities for controlling image sensors using CSI-2.

Technology & speeds 
For EMI reasons the system designer can select between two different clock rates (a and b) in each of the M-PHY speed levels.

See also 
 Display Serial Interface
 Camera Link

References 

MIPI Alliance standards
Serial buses